Kateřina Šimáčková (born 1966) is a Czech judge who served on the Constitutional Court of the Czech Republic since 2013. On 28 September 2021, she was elected a judge of the European Court of Human Rights with respect to the Czech Republic, replacing Aleš Pejchal. Šimáčková remains with the Czech Constitutional Court until 13 December 2021 at which point she will go to Strasbourg.

In 2021, she received the distinction of the French Legion of Honour for her role in promoting human rights.

References

Constitutional Court of the Czech Republic judges
1966 births
Living people
People from Brno
Czech judges of international courts and tribunals
Judges of the European Court of Human Rights
21st-century women judges
21st-century judges
Chevaliers of the Légion d'honneur